Strood railway station serves the town of Strood in Medway, England. It is on the North Kent Line and is also a terminus of the Medway Valley Line.

Train services are operated by Southeastern and Thameslink.

History

The South Eastern Railway (SER) had reached Strood in 1845 as the terminus of the line from Gravesend. The new line left the line from Gravesend between Strood Tunnel and the original Strood terminus; a new Strood station was provided on the Maidstone line, and it opened with the line on 18 June 1856.

The London, Chatham & Dover Railway (which the EKR had become in 1859) soon opened their own route from  towards London, the first portion as far as  opening on 3 December 1860. The curve connecting the LCDR line with Strood station fell into disuse (apart from one goods train in each direction per day), but passenger services over this line were reintroduced in early 1877 at the insistence of the Mayor of Chatham. The Mayor's name was Toomer, and the line then became known as the "Toomer Loop".

Although Strood station was the property of the SER, the Toomer Loop, together with the stations at Rochester and Chatham, was LCDR property. A second junction at Strood was bought into use on 20 July 1891, when the first section of the Rochester & Chatham Extension was opened, by which SER trains reached their own stations at Rochester and, from 1 March 1892, Chatham. This line was to the north-east of, and largely ran parallel to, the LCDR line; it had its own bridge over the Medway. On 1 January 1899 the SER and LCDR entered into a working union which traded as the South Eastern & Chatham Railway (SE&CR) and set about eliminating duplicated facilities. In 1911, a connecting line was put in between the SER and LCDR on the south-eastern side of the SER's Rochester Bridge; this allowed trains from Strood to reach the LCDR stations at Rochester and Chatham from October 1911. In 1927 (after the SER & LCDR had merged with other railways to form the Southern Railway), another connecting line was put in between the former SER and LCDR routes on the north-eastern side of the SER's Rochester Bridge; this enabled the LCDR's bridge to be taken out of use.

Southeastern introduced a full timetable of domestic high-speed services branded Southeastern Highspeed over High Speed 1 between London St Pancras and Ashford International on 13 December 2009, although public preview services had been running since 29 June 2009. High-speed trains use High Speed 1 calling at Stratford International and Ebbsfleet International. Trains from London to the Medway towns and Faversham leave the high-speed line at Ebbsfleet and continue via the North Kent line through Gravesend, Strood, Rochester. A limited peak hour service now also operates between St Pancras and Maidstone West via Ebbsfleet and Strood.

At the same time there was the largest change to the timetable in the area in 40 years in order to accommodate the extra trains.  This meant that rail services from Newington and Teynham were cut, in order to facilitate this new service.
To use the train service over the High Speed 1 section of line generally requires payment of a surcharge.

In December 2017, the station received a £2.59 million refurbishment which included new entrances, a larger booking hall and a new waiting room.

Facilities

The station has three platforms; Platform 1 is directly accessible from the station building. Platforms 2 and 3 are on an island platform. The entrance, ticket office and ticket barriers adjoin Platform 1, with a tunnel from that platform leading to the island. In 2014, a new bridge with lifts was built at the southern end of the station to replace the tunnel and provide wheelchair access to the island platform. As of summer 2015 both the bridge and tunnel are open.

Until the early 1980s, an additional entrance to the station was located on Station Road. The entrance was a continuation of the station subway, the external building is still extant on Station Road, although all windows and doors have been bricked up. The building contained a small ticket office.

Services

The typical off-peak service in trains per hour is:
 2 tph to  via  and 
 1 tph to London St Pancras International
 2 tph to 
 1 tph to  via 
 2 tph to  via 

During the peak hours, there are additional Southeastern services to London Charing Cross via  which start and terminate at Strood. Additional services to Maidstone West, Tonbridge and Faversham also run during the peak hours.

There are also 4 peak hour trains per day between Maidstone West and London St Pancras International, operated by Southeastern.

References

External links

 Old photograph of Strood station from Medway Archives and Local Studies Centre website

Railway stations in Medway
DfT Category D stations
Former South Eastern Railway (UK) stations
Railway stations in Great Britain opened in 1856
Railway stations served by Southeastern
Railway stations served by Govia Thameslink Railway